Renee Clama (1908–1990) was a British actress of Italian parentage. She appeared, often in leading roles, in eleven British films of late 1920s and early 1930s including The Great Game (1930) and Never Trouble Trouble (1931) Many of her films were made by Gainsborough Pictures.

Filmography
 Adventurous Youth (1928)
 Taxi for Two (1929)
 The Devil's Maze (1929)
 The Great Game (1930)
 Greek Street (1930)
 Symphony in Two Flats (1930)
 No Lady (1931)
 The Stronger Sex (1931)
 Never Trouble Trouble (1931)
 The Sport of Kings (1931)
 The Man They Couldn't Arrest (1931)

References

Bibliography
 Low, Rachael. Filmmaking in 1930s Britain. George Allen & Unwin, 1985.

External links

1908 births
1990 deaths
British film actresses
Actresses from London
20th-century British actresses
20th-century English women
20th-century English people